Elmoia is a genus of flies in the family Dolichopodidae, endemic to Hawaii. It is part of the Eurynogaster complex of genera. The genus is named in honor of D. Elmo Hardy.

Species
 Elmoia bullata (Hardy & Kohn, 1964)
 Elmoia exartema (Hardy & Kohn, 1964)
 Elmoia hamata (Hardy & Kohn, 1964)
 Elmoia lanceolata (Tenorio, 1969)
 Elmoia multispinosa (Hardy & Kohn, 1964)
 Elmoia nigrohalterata (Parent, 1939)
 Elmoia saxatilis (Grimshaw, 1901)
 Elmoia viridifacies (Parent, 1938)

References

Hydrophorinae
Dolichopodidae genera
Insects of Hawaii
Endemic fauna of Hawaii